Spain is a nation that has competed at the Hopman Cup tournament on fourteen occasions, their first appearance coming at the 2nd annual staging of the event in 1990. They have won the tournament four times: in 1990, 2002, 2010 and 2013. They were also the runners-up on two occasions: in 1993 and 2007.

Players
This is a list of players who have played for Spain in the Hopman Cup.

Results

1 Having already won the two singles rubbers and thus the title, Germany conceded the mixed doubles dead rubber against Spain in the 1993 final. This gave the Germans a 2–1 victory overall.
2 In 1999, Spain did not compete in their final tie against South Africa. They were instead replaced by Zimbabwe.
3 In 2002, Spain's final round robin tie against Australia was cancelled, with Australia giving Spain a 3–0 walkover. This was due to Australian opponent, Lleyton Hewitt, being diagnosed with chicken pox and being unable to compete. The women's singles match was, however, played as an exhibition match.
4 In the 2007 final against Russia, the mixed doubles dead rubber was not played.
5 In the tie against Romania in 2010, opponent Victor Hănescu was forced to retire during the men's singles and forfeit the mixed doubles, contributing two points to Spain's 3–0 victory over Romania.
6 In the 2012 tie against France, the dead mixed doubles rubber was not played.

References

Hopman Cup teams
Hopman Cup